Basketball at the 2005 Games of the Small States of Europe was held from 30 May to 4 June 2005. Games were played at the Poliesportiu d'Andorra, in Andorra la Vella, Andorra.

Medal summary

Men's tournament
Men's tournament was played by a round-robin group composed by five teams.

Table

Women's tournament
Women's tournament was played by a round-robin group composed by four teams.

Table

External links
Andorra 2005 Official Website

Small
2005 Games of the Small States of Europe
2005
International basketball competitions hosted by Andorra